The Bulgarian Orthodox Church, legally the Patriarchate of Bulgaria, is an autocephalous Eastern Orthodox jurisdiction based in Bulgaria. It is the oldest Slavic Orthodox church, with some 6 million members in Bulgaria and between 1.5 and 2 million members in a number of other European countries, Asia, the Americas, Australia, and New Zealand. It was recognized as autocephalous in 1945 by the Ecumenical Patriarchate of Constantinople.

History

Early Christianity

The Bulgarian Orthodox Church has its origin in the flourishing Christian communities and churches set up in the Balkans as early as the first centuries of the Christian era. Christianity was brought to the Balkans by the apostles Paul and Andrew in the 1st century AD, when the first organised Christian communities were formed. By the beginning of the 4th century, Christianity had become the dominant religion in the region. Towns such as Serdica (Sofia), Philipopolis (Plovdiv), Odessus (Varna), Dorostorum (Silistra) and Adrianople (Edirne) were significant centres of Christianity in the Roman Empire.

The Monastery of Saint Athanasius, the first Christian monastery in Europe, was founded in Thrace in 344 by Athanasius near modern-day Chirpan, Bulgaria, following the Council of Serdica and the Edict of Serdica.

The barbarian raids and incursions in the 4th and the 5th centuries, and the settlement of Slavs and Bulgars in the 6th and the 7th centuries, wrought considerable damage to the ecclesiastical organisation of the Christian Church in the Bulgarian lands, yet did not destroy it. Kubrat and Organa were both baptized together in Constantinople and Christianity started to pave its way from the surviving Christian communities to the surrounding Bulgar-Slavic mass. By the middle of the 9th century, the majority of the Bulgarian Slavs, especially those living in Thrace and Macedonia, were Christianized. The process of conversion also enjoyed some success among the Bulgar nobility. However, it was not until the official adoption of Christianity by Khan Boris I in 865 that an independent Bulgarian ecclesiastical entity was established.

Establishment

Boris I believed that cultural advancement and the sovereignty and prestige of a Christian Bulgaria could be achieved through an enlightened clergy governed by an autocephalous church. To this end, he manoeuvred between the Patriarch of Constantinople and the Roman Pope for a period of five years until in 870 AD, the Fourth Council of Constantinople granted the Bulgarians an autonomous Bulgarian archbishopric. The archbishopric had its seat in the Bulgarian capital of Pliska, and its diocese covered the whole territory of the Bulgarian state. The tug-of-war between Rome and Constantinople was resolved by putting the Bulgarian archbishopric under the jurisdiction of the Patriarch of Constantinople and the Orthodox Church, from whom it obtained its first primate, its clergy, and theological books.

Although the archbishopric enjoyed full internal autonomy, the goals of Boris I were scarcely fulfilled.  A Greek liturgy offered by a Byzantine clergy furthered neither the cultural development of the Bulgarians, nor the consolidation of the Bulgarian Empire; it would have eventually resulted in the loss of both the identity of the people and the statehood of Bulgaria. Following the Byzantine theory of "Imperium sine Patriarcha non staret", which said that a close relation should exist between an Empire and Patriarchate, Boris I greeted the arrival of the disciples of the recently deceased Saints Cyril and Methodius in 886 as an opportunity. Boris I gave them the task of instructing the future Bulgarian clergy in the Glagolitic alphabet and the Slavonic liturgy prepared by Cyril. The liturgy was based on the vernacular of the Bulgarian Slavs from the region of Thessaloniki. In 893, Boris I expelled the Greek clergy from the country and ordered the Greek language to be replaced with the Slav-Bulgarian vernacular.

Autocephaly and Patriarchate

Following Bulgaria's two decisive victories over the Byzantines at Acheloos (near the present-day city of Pomorie) and Katasyrtai (near Constantinople), the government declared the autonomous Bulgarian Archbishopric as autocephalous and elevated it to the rank of Patriarchate at an ecclesiastical and national council held in 919. After Bulgaria and the Byzantine Empire signed a peace treaty in 927 that concluded the 20-year-long war between them, the Patriarchate of Constantinople recognised the autocephalous status of the Bulgarian Orthodox Church and acknowledged its patriarchal dignity.

The Bulgarian Patriarchate was the first autocephalous Slavic Orthodox Church, preceding the autocephaly of the Serbian Orthodox Church (1219) by 300 years and of the Russian Orthodox Church (1596) by some 600 years. It was the sixth Patriarchate after the Pentarchy patriarchates of Rome, Constantinople, Alexandria, Antioch and Jerusalem. The seat of the Patriarchate was the new Bulgarian capital of Preslav.  The Patriarch was likely to have resided in the town of Drastar (Silistra), an old Christian centre noted for its martyrs and Christian traditions.

Ohrid Archbishopric

On April 5, 972, Byzantine Emperor John I Tzimisces conquered and burned down Preslav, and captured Bulgarian Tsar Boris II. Patriarch Damyan managed to escape, initially to Sredetz (Sofia) in western Bulgaria. In the coming years, the residence of the Bulgarian patriarchs remained closely connected to the developments in the war between the next Bulgarian royal dynasty, the Comitopuli, and the Byzantine Empire.  Patriarch German resided consecutively in the medieval Bulgarian cities of Maglen (Almopia) and Voden (Edessa) (both in present-day north-western Greece), and Prespa (in present-day southern North Macedonia).  Around 990, the next patriarch, Philip, moved to Ohrid (in present-day south-western North Macedonia), which became the permanent seat of the Patriarchate.

After Bulgaria fell under Byzantine domination in 1018, Emperor Basil II Bulgaroktonos (the “Bulgar-Slayer”) acknowledged the autocephalous status of the Bulgarian Orthodox Church. By special charters (royal decrees), his government set up its boundaries, dioceses, property and other privileges. He deprived the church of its Patriarchal title and reduced it to the rank of an archbishopric. Although the first appointed archbishop (John of Debar) was a Bulgarian, his successors, as well as the whole higher clergy, were selected from Byzantines. The monks and the ordinary priests continued to be predominantly Bulgarian. To a large extent the archbishopric preserved its national character, upheld the Slavonic liturgy, and continued its contribution to the development of Bulgarian literature. The autocephaly of the Ohrid Archbishopric remained respected during the periods of Byzantine, Bulgarian, Serbian, and Ottoman rule. The church continued to exist until it was unlawfully abolished in 1767.

Tarnovo Patriarchate 

As a result of the successful uprising of the brothers Peter IV
and Ivan Asen I in 1185/1186, the foundations of the Second Bulgarian Empire were laid with Tarnovo as its capital. Following Boris I’s principle that the sovereignty of the state is inextricably linked to the autocephaly of the Church, the two brothers immediately took steps to restore the Bulgarian Patriarchate. As a start, they established an independent archbishopric in Tarnovo in 1186. The struggle to have the archbishopric recognized according to the canonical order and elevated to the rank of a Patriarchate took almost 50 years. Following the example of Boris I, Bulgarian Tsar Kaloyan manoeuvred for years between the Patriarch of Constantinople and Pope Innocent III.  Finally in 1203 the latter proclaimed the Tarnovo Archbishop Vassily "Primate and Archbishop of all Bulgaria and Walachia."  The union with the Roman Catholic Church continued for well over two decades.

Under the reign of Tsar Ivan Asen II (1218–1241), conditions were created for the termination of the union with Rome and for the recognition of the autocephalous status of the Bulgarian Orthodox Church. In 1235 a church council was convened in the town of Lampsakos. Under the presidency of Patriarch Germanus II of Constantinople and with the consent of all Eastern Patriarchs, the council confirmed the Patriarchal dignity of the Bulgarian Orthodox Church and consecrated the Bulgarian archbishop German as Patriarch.

Despite the shrinking of the diocese of the Tarnovo Patriarchate at the end of the 13th century, its authority in the Eastern Orthodox world remained high. The Patriarch of Tarnovo confirmed the patriarchal dignity of the Serbian Orthodox Church in 1346, despite protests by the Patriarchate of Constantinople. The Tarnovo Literary School developed under the wing of the Patriarchate in the 14th century, with scholars of the rank of Patriarch Evtimiy, Gregory Tsamblak, and Konstantin of Kostenets. A considerable flowering was noted in the fields of literature, architecture, and painting; the religious and theological literature also flourished.

Tarnovo fell under domination by the Ottoman Empire in 1393, whose leaders sent Patriarch Evtimiy into exile, the autocephalous church organization was destroyed again the next year and integrated into the Ecumenical Patriarchate. In 1394, the Holy Synod of the Ecumenical Patriarchate gave the authorisation to the Metropolitan of Moldavia, Jeremiah, "to move with the help of God to the holy Church of Turnovo and to be allowed to perform everything befitting a prelate freely and without restraint." By around 1416, the territory of the Patriarchate of Turnovo was totally subordinated to the Ecumenical Patriarchate. The other Bulgarian religious centrethe Ohrid Archbishopric survived until 1767.

Ottoman rule 
As the Ottomans were Muslim, the period of Ottoman rule was the most difficult in the history of the Bulgarian Orthodox Church, to the same extent as it was the hardest in the history of the Bulgarian people. During and immediately after the Ottoman conquest, their forces razed a significant number of Bulgarian churches and monasteries south of the Danube River, including the Patriarchal Cathedral church of the Holy Ascension in Tarnovo. Some of the surviving structures were converted into mosques. Many of the clergy were killed, while the intelligentsia associated with the Tarnovo Literary School fled north of the Danube. 

Martyrs to the church were made during the forceful conversion to Islam of many districts and almost all larger towns in the Bulgarian provinces of the Ottoman Empire. St. George of Kratovo (d. 1515), St. Nicholas of Sofia (d. 1515), St. Damaskin of Gabrovo (d. 1771), St. Zlata of Muglen (d. 1795), St. John the Bulgarian (d. 1814), St. Ignatius of Stara Zagora (d. 1814), St. Onouphry of Gabrovo (d. 1818) and many others died defending their Christian faith. 

After many of the leadership of the Bulgarian Orthodox Church were executed, it was fully subordinated to the Patriarch of Constantinople. The millet system in the Ottoman Empire granted a number of important civil and judicial functions to the Patriarch of Constantinople and the diocesan metropolitans. As the higher Bulgarian church clerics were replaced by Greek ones at the beginning of the Ottoman domination, the Bulgarian population was subjected to double oppressionpolitical by the Ottomans and cultural by the Greek clergy.  With the rise of Greek nationalism in the second half of the 18th century, the clergy imposed the Greek language and a Greek consciousness on the emerging Bulgarian bourgeoisie.  They used the Patriarchate of Constantinople to assimilate other peoples.  At the end of the 18th and the beginning of the 19th century, the clergy opened numerous schools with total Greek language curriculum; they nearly banned the Bulgarian-language liturgy.  These actions threatened the survival of the Bulgarians as a separate nation and people with its own, distinct national culture. 

Throughout the centuries of Ottoman domination, the Orthodox monasteries were instrumental in the preservation of the Bulgarian language and the Bulgarian national consciousness.  Especially important were the Zograph and Hilandar monasteries on Mount Athos, as well as the Rila, Troyan, Etropole, Dryanovo, Cherepish and Dragalevtsi monasteries in Bulgaria.  The monks managed to preserve their national character in the monasteries, continuing traditions of the Slavonic liturgy and Bulgarian literature.  They continued to operate monastery schools and carried out other educational activities, which managed to keep the flame of the Bulgarian culture burning.

Bulgarian Exarchate 
 

In 1762, St. Paisius of Hilendar (1722–1773), a monk from the south-western Bulgarian town of Bansko, wrote a short historical work.  It was the first work written in the modern Bulgarian vernacular and was also the first call for a national awakening. In History of Slav-Bulgarians, Paissiy urged his compatriots to throw off subjugation to the Greek language and culture. The example of Paissiy was followed by a number of other activists, including St. Sophroniy of Vratsa (Sofroni Vrachanski) (1739–1813), hieromonk Spiridon of Gabrovo, hieromonk Yoakim Karchovski (d. 1820), hieromonk Kiril Peychinovich (d. 1845).

Discontent with the supremacy of the Greek clergy started to flare up in several Bulgarian dioceses as early as the 1820s. It was not until 1850 that the Bulgarians initiated a purposeful struggle against the Greek clerics in a number of bishoprics, demanding their replacement with Bulgarian ones. By that time, most Bulgarian clergy had realised that further struggle for the rights of the Bulgarians in the Ottoman Empire could not succeed unless they managed to obtain some degree of autonomy from the Patriarchate of Constantinople.  As the Ottomans identified nationality with religion, and the Bulgarians were Eastern Orthodox, the Ottomans considered them part of the Roum-Milet, i.e., the Greeks.  To gain Bulgarian schools and liturgy, the Bulgarians needed to achieve an independent ecclesiastical organisation.

The struggle between the Bulgarians, led by Neofit Bozveli and Ilarion Makariopolski, and the Greeks intensified throughout the 1860s.  By the end of the decade, Bulgarian bishoprics had expelled most of the Greek clerics, thus the whole of northern Bulgaria, as well as the northern parts of Thrace and Macedonia had effectively seceded from the Patriarchate.  The Ottoman government restored the Bulgarian Patriarchate under the name of "Bulgarian Exarchate" by a decree (firman) of the Sultan promulgated on February 28, 1870.  The original Exarchate extended over present-day northern Bulgaria (Moesia), Thrace without the Vilayet of Adrianople, as well as over north-eastern Macedonia.  After the Christian population of the bishoprics of Skopje and Ohrid voted in 1874 overwhelmingly in favour of joining the Exarchate (Skopje by 91%, Ohrid by 97%), the Bulgarian Exarchate became in control of the whole of Vardar and Pirin Macedonia.  The Bulgarian Exarchate was partially represented in southern Macedonia and the Vilayet of Adrianople by vicars.  Thus, the borders of the Exarchate included all Bulgarian districts in the Ottoman Empire.

The Patriarchate of Constantinople opposed the change, promptly declaring the Bulgarian Exarchate schismatic and its adherents heretics.  Although the status and the guiding principles of the Exarchate reflected the canons, the Patriarchate argued that “surrender of Orthodoxy to ethnic nationalism” was essentially a manifestation of heresy.

The first Bulgarian Exarch was Antim I, who was elected by the Holy Synod of the Exarchate in February, 1872. He was discharged by the Ottoman government immediately after the outbreak of the Russo-Turkish War on April 24, 1877, and was sent into exile in Ankara. His successor, Joseph I, managed to develop and considerably extend its church and school network in the Bulgarian Principality, Eastern Rumelia, Macedonia and the Adrianople Vilayet. In 1895, the Tarnovo Constitution formally established the Bulgarian Orthodox Church as the national religion of the nation. On the eve of the Balkan Wars, in Macedonia and the Adrianople Vilayet, the Bulgarian Exarchate had seven dioceses with prelates and eight more with acting chairmen in charge and 38 vicariates; 1,218 parishes and 1,212 parish priests; 64 monasteries and 202 chapels; as well as of 1,373 schools with 2,266 teachers and 78,854 pupils.

After World War I, by virtue of the peace treaties, the Bulgarian Exarchate was deprived of its dioceses in Macedonia and Aegean Thrace. Exarch Joseph I transferred his offices from Istanbul to Sofia as early as 1913. After the death of Joseph I in 1915, the Bulgarian Orthodox Church was not in a position to elect its regular head for a total of three decades.

Second restoration of the Bulgarian Patriarchate

Conditions for the restoration of the Bulgarian Patriarchate and the election of a head of the Bulgarian Church were created after World War II. In 1945 the schism was lifted and the Patriarch of Constantinople recognised the autocephaly of the Bulgarian Church. In 1950, the Holy Synod adopted a new Statute which paved the way for the restoration of the Patriarchate and in 1953, it elected the Metropolitan of Plovdiv, Cyril, Bulgarian Patriarch. After the death of Patriarch Cyril in 1971, in his place was elected the Metropolitan of Lovech, Maxim, leading the church until his death in 2012.  On 10 November 2012 Metropolitan Cyril of Varna and Veliki Preslav was chosen as interim leader to organize the election of the new Patriarch within four months. 
At the church council convened to elect a new Patriarch 24 February 2013, the Metropolitan of Ruse, Neophyt was elected Patriarch of the Bulgarian Orthodox Church with 90 votes against 47 for Metropolitan Gabriel of Lovech.

Under Communism (1944–89), Bulgaria's rulers worked to control rather than destroy the church.  Still, the early postwar years were unsettling to church hierarchs. During 1944-47 the church was deprived of jurisdiction in marriage, divorce, issuance of birth and death certificates, and other passages that had been sacraments as well as state events. Communists removed study of the catechism and church history from school curricula.  They generated anti-religious propaganda and persecuted some priests.  From 1947-49 was the height of the campaign to intimidate the church. Bishop Boris was assassinated; Egumenius Kalistrat, administrator of the Rila Monastery, was imprisoned; and various other clergy were murdered or charged with crimes against the state.  The communists soon replaced all clergy who refused to endorse the regime's policies.  They banished Exarch Stefan, who had co-authored a book in 1948 that was considered anti-Communist.

From that time until the dissolution of the Soviet Union and the end of Communist rule in 1989, the Bulgarian Orthodox Church and the Bulgarian Communist Party and State Security coexisted in a closely symbiotic partnership, in which each supported the other. 11 (out of 15)  members of Bulgarian Orthodox Church's Holy Synod worked for communist State Security. The party supported the elevation of the exarchate to the rank of patriarchate in May 1953. The 1970 commemoration served to recall that the exarchate (which retained its jurisdictional borders until after World War I) included Macedonia and Thrace in addition to present-day Bulgaria. Along with some other autocephalous Orthodox churches, the Bulgarian Orthodox Church does not recognize the autocephaly of the Macedonian Orthodox Church, however it restored communion with it on 22 June 2022.

Canonical status and organization
The Bulgarian Orthodox Church considers itself an inseparable member of the one, holy, synodal and apostolic church and is organized as a self-governing body under the name of Patriarchate. It is divided into thirteen dioceses within the boundaries of the Republic of Bulgaria and has jurisdiction over additional two dioceses for Bulgarians in Western and Central Europe, and the Americas, Canada and Australia. The dioceses of the Bulgarian Orthodox Church are divided into 58 church counties, which, in turn, are subdivided into some 2,600 parishes.

The supreme clerical, judicial and administrative power for the whole domain of the Bulgarian Orthodox Church is exercised by the Holy Synod, which includes the Patriarch and the diocesan prelates, who are called metropolitans. Church life in the parishes is guided by the parish priests, numbering some 1,500.

Eparchies in Bulgaria: (with Bulgarian names in brackets)
Eparchy of Vidin
Eparchy of Vratsa
Eparchy of Lovech
Eparchy of Veliko Tarnovo
Eparchy of Dorostol (seat in Silistra)
Eparchy of Varna and Veliki Preslav (seat in Varna)
Eparchy of Sliven
Eparchy of Stara Zagora
Eparchy of Plovdiv
Eparchy of Sofia
Eparchy of Nevrokop
Eparchy of Pleven
Eparchy of Ruse

Eparchies abroad:
Eparchy of Central and Western Europe (with seat in Berlin);
Eparchy of USA, Canada and Australia (with seat in New York City)

The Bulgarian Orthodox Church also has some 120 monasteries in Bulgaria, with about 2,000 monks and nearly as many nuns.

See also

 List of Orthodox Churches
 Bulgarian Alternative Synod

References

External links

 The official website of the Bulgarian Patriarchate
Unofficial web portal of Bulgarian Orthodox Christianity: in Bulgarian language
 History of Bulgaria and the Bulgarian Orthodox Church according to the Catholic Encyclopedia (1913).
A short history of the Bulgarian Orthodox Church by CNEWA, the papal agency for humanitarian and pastoral support
The Bulgarian Orthodox Church according to Overview of World Religions
Article about the Bulgarian Orthodox Church and Religion in Bulgaria
Orthodox Life Info Portal: a Bulgarian Orthodox site (in English)
Article on the medieval history of the Bulgarian Orthodox Church in the repository of the Institute for Byzantine Studies of the Austrian Academy of Sciences (in German)

 
National churches
Religious organizations established in the 920s
Eastern Orthodox Church bodies in Europe
European-Australian culture